Prunella was an 18th-century worsted fabric also made with a blend of silk. It was produced in Norwich. Prunella was used in a variety of garments such as Petticoats, academic and barristers’ gowns, judges’ robes, coats, waistcoats, and shoes.

Etymology
Prunella was named from the French , meaning sloe, for its dark colour.

Weave 
Prunella was a warp faced weave structure.

Variations 
Though the cloth was initially worsted material sometimes a combination with silk, or with cotton in the weft, was used.

References 

Woven fabrics